The Guernsey Railway opened as the Guernsey Steam Tramway on 6 June 1879 with two steam tram engines, more being added later.  It was later converted to  an electric tramway, which began working on 20 February 1892.  The system closed on 9 June 1934.  This leaves Alderney as the only Channel Island with a working railway.

Guernsey Steam Tramway Company

The Guernsey Steam Tramway Company was registered in London on 29 May 1878, the concession having been granted by the States of Guernsey on 2 May 1877, and confirmed by an Order in Council of 13 August 1877.

The line extended for about three miles from Saint Peter Port, the principal town, to Saint Sampson's, a smaller port which at that time had extensive granite quarries. The line was single track with passing loops, with a maximum gradient of 1 in 32.

The contract for construction was awarded to John Howard F.R.G.S and the value was a little over £4,000 per mile (equal to £ today).

The first Merryweather steam engine and carriage arrived only on 4 June on the S.S. Stannington. This remained the situation for the first four weeks of operation and restricted the receipts. By the week ending 23 August, Mr William Gumbley the manager reported 6,780 passengers with total receipts of £67 1s 10d.

Two further Merryweather steam tram engines were delivered at a cost of £700 each (equal to £ today).

Before it could open the system was examined by Major General Charles Scrope Hutchinson Inspector of Railways for the Board of Trade  in the company of Mr Yockney C.E., the company engineer, John Howard F.R.G.S., the contractor and Mr. Duqeumin the State Surveyor and permission was granted to operate the service with two conditions:
 The rate of speed shall not exceed 4 miles per hour upon the rails which have been temporarily laid between the Piette and the Salirie, and at the curve near the house called Radford’s Coffee House, near the corner of the Bouët Road
 A watchman shall be stationed until further notice at the corner of the Bouët Road, and at the corner of Radford’s house during all the time that the trains are running.

Service commenced on 6 June 1879 and was well received, 2,000 people being carried on the first two days. Trains ran hourly between the harbours, taking 18 minutes for the journey, and consisting of a first class closed car, and a second class open car. Fares were 3d for first class and 2d for second. Each engine ran 72 miles daily.

In 1885 the locomotive stock had increased to its maximum of six, comprising two by Merryweather and four by Hughes of Loughborough. From this time there was a gradual loss of passengers owing to horse bus competition, favoured no doubt by the freedom from noise and smoke. Trams ceased running on 22 January 1889, but service resumed on 2 December 1889 after the company had been reorganised. It was re-registered as the Guernsey Railway Company on 22 September 1889.

Statistics

 1880, passengers 319,033, revenue £2,071
 1885, passengers 416,970, revenue £2,941

List of steam tram engines

 arr. = date arrived in Guernsey

Steam pulled wagons

Guernsey Railway Company

The line was electrified in 1892 by Siemens, and electric services started on 20 February 1892. Apart from an experimental line in Leeds, it was the first street tramway in the British Isles to be supplied with current from an overhead wire.

Initial services were offered with two cars, power being supplied by a Marshall's semi-portable engine and generator capable of running four cars. The line was run under lease by Siemens until things were running smoothly when in October 1893 the Guernsey Railway Company took over. The Railway Company also bought out the horse bus competition for £3,000 (equal to £ today), plus £1,500 shares. In 1898 the last of the steam trams were sold.

The depot was at Hougue à la Perre, and consisted of a shed with three tracks with pits, together with the power house and workshops, all built of stone and brick. 

The generating plant comprised two compound steam engines of 25 hp each, and two boilers each fitted with a Friedman injector and a feed water heater, and fed by a Worthington pump. Only one engine was necessary at any one time to produce sufficient power, so they were worked alternatively each fortnight. A Siemens compound-wound central station dynamo was capable of producing 100 amps at 500 volts. The power was supplied to the cars by a trolley wire of 9mm copper, spanned at between 40 and 48 yards about 2 feet outside the track on light bracket arm poles. 

For the three months ending 31 December 1893, the usage statistics were as follows:
Average number of cars running = 8
Average daily mileage per car = 70
Average speed in miles per hour = 7.2
Average pounds of coal consumed per car-mile = 8
Average number of passenger per car-mile = 7
Cost of operation per car mile = 5.791d..

The normal weekday service was 10 minutes. An early car left St. Sampson's at 6.20 am, arriving in town at 6.40. It was driven by the veteran Mr. Dunn, the night cleaner. Six cars were usually used with eight crews, and one more for meal relief. On Sundays, cars commenced running at 1.30 pm. The men had one day off in eight. On holidays and football match days, all the cars and trailers were in use, and were packed solid. During the match they were parked on the siding at Vale Road, when the crews were apparently at liberty to watch the game so this "split turn" was not unpopular.

In the First World War, 50 of the staff joined up, and six were killed. In 1920 there were further track renewals, a new loop was provided at Bulwer Avenue, and also a new repair shed was constructed.

During the first years of the 1930s, passenger traffic declined from over 1 million per year to less than half that. A financial investigation found that trams cost 9d per mile, whereas buses cost 5½d per mile. Revenues had fallen and the company had not paid a dividend since 1923.

The last day of service was 9 June 1934. Two days later track removal commenced and the sale of tramcar bodies commenced.

Statistics
 1912, 143,272 car miles, 914,222 passengers
 1922, 150,924 car miles, 1,276,913 passengers
 1932, 163,479 car miles, 783,647 passengers

Electric Fleet

The company livery was maroon and cream.

Activity since closure
Guernsey Railway Co Ltd continued in existence (as a bus operator) until 1980, when its operation was taken over by Guernseybus.

In 2004 there was a plan to run a heritage tram service and restore some original trams to operate it. No further progress has been made.

See also

 List of Channel Islands railways
 Transport in Guernsey

References

Notes

Bibliography
 The Railway Magazine, September 1934
 100 Years of Public Transport - A Short History of the Guernsey Railway Co Ltd, by W J Carman, published by Guernsey Press c. 1978
 Railways of the Channel Islands,  A Pictorial Survey compiled by C Judge, published by The Oakwood Press 1992, 
 Carman, John Guernsey's Trams, (2002)

External links
 British Trams Online

Railway lines in the Channel Islands
Transport in Guernsey
Railway lines opened in 1879
Railway lines closed in 1934